"The River" is a song recorded by Christian rock singer Jordan Feliz for his first studio album released on the Centricity Music label. The song spent ten weeks at No. 1 on Billboards National Christian Audience chart and seven weeks on the CHR/Hot AC chart. The song was made part of his debut album of the same name, released in April 2016.

Chart history

Certifications

References

2015 debut singles
Songs about rivers
2015 songs
Jordan Feliz songs